Albert Collon was a Belgian ice hockey player. He won a silver medal at the Ice Hockey European Championship 1927, and finished fifth at the 1928 Winter Olympics.

References 

Year of birth missing
Year of death missing
Ice hockey players at the 1928 Winter Olympics
Olympic ice hockey players of Belgium
Belgian ice hockey left wingers